Harvey Maynard Salem (born January 15, 1961) is a former American football guard and tackle who played ten seasons in the National Football League.

References

1961 births
Living people
Players of American football from Berkeley, California
American football offensive guards
American football offensive tackles
California Golden Bears football players
Houston Oilers players
Detroit Lions players
Denver Broncos players
Green Bay Packers players